is an island, part of the Okinawa Islands and administratively part of the town of Kumejima, Okinawa Prefecture, Japan. The island had a population of 8,713 (2010).

Kume Island is a volcanic island. Its principal economic activities are the production of sugarcane and tourism.

Climate

References

Okinawa Islands
Islands of Okinawa Prefecture
Kumejima, Okinawa